State Road 3 (SR 3) in the U.S. state of Indiana is a discontinuous state highway running through eastern Indiana from near the Ohio River to near the Michigan state line. The southernmost terminus is at SR 62 in Charlestown, and the northernmost terminus is at SR 120 near Brighton.

The route was continuous until 1972, when the route was split into two segments that exist today.

Route description

Southern section
SR 3 begins just south of Charlestown at SR 62 and heads north toward downtown Charlestown. When in downtown Charlestown SR 3 intersects SR 403. SR 3 heads north out of Charlestown. After SR 203, SR 3 heads north toward Vernon and then North Vernon. In North Vernon SR 3 has an intersection with U.S. Route 50 (US 50). After North Vernon SR 3 heads mainly due north for  until SR 46 just west of Greensburg. SR 3 joins SR 46 on a four-lane divided highway and then enters Greensburg from the southwest. After entering Greensburg SR 46 leaves SR 3 at Main Street. In downtown Greensburg SR 3 has an intersection with US 421.

After US 421, SR 3 leaves Greensburg heading northeast, then just north. SR 3 has an interchange with Interstate 74 (I-74),  from US 421. After I-74, SR 3 becomes a two-lane undivided highway. SR 3 heads due north toward US 40 and then SR 3 heads east on US 40 for a short concurrency after . After US 40, SR 3 has an interchange with I-70. Just south of I-70 SR 3 becomes a four-lane divided highway. After I-70, SR 3 passes near New Castle. SR 3 and US 36 have an interchange near Mount Summit. After US 36, SR 3 head north toward Muncie, where SR 3 has an interchange with SR 67.

At the interchange with SR 67, SR 3 heads east, then north along the bypass. Interchange includes US 35 south, SR 32, and SR 67 north. The bypass is a limited-access highway.

North of the Muncie Bypass, US 35 leaves SR 3 due west to Kokomo. After US 35, SR 3 heads due north to Markle. Passing through Hartford City, where SR 3 meets SR 26. South of Markle SR 3 turns northeast, then SR 3 meets SR 116. Then  after SR 116, SR 3 comes to its northern terminus of the southern section of SR 3, at US 224.

Northern section 

The southern terminus of the northern section of SR 3 begins at I-69 and the northern terminus of US 27. The road heads north from this point, as a six–lane major arterial passing through both commercial and residential areas. North of Dupont Road, on the northside of Fort Wayne, the road becomes a rural four–lane divided highway. The road then enters Dekalb County, with a traffic light at SR 205. Very soon after SR 205, the road enters Noble County, bypassing LaOtto and Avilla. In Noble County, the route passes through rural farming land and parallels an abandoned railroad track on its way to Kendallville. In Kendallville the route has a short concurrency with US 6. After the US 6 concurrency SR 3, becomes a two–lane rural highway heading due North, until Mongo where the road turns northwest. Entering into Brighton, SR 3 reaches its northern terminus at SR 120.

History 
Between 1972 and 1973, SR 3 was removed between US 224 in Markle and I-69 on the north side of Fort Wayne. The final route through the Fort Wayne metro area followed Indianapolis Road/Baer Road past the city's main airport (then known as Baer Field) to Lower Huntington Road in the Waynedale district of Fort Wayne. SR 3 there turned east onto that road for only a short distance, before turning north again onto Bluffton Road (SR 1). Bluffton Road hugs the bank of the St. Mary's River before curving east and crossing it. SR 1 and SR 3 then immediately turned south onto Broadway for two blocks before turning east onto Rudisill Boulevard. SR 1/SR 3 followed Rudisill Boulevard to Lafayette Street (US 27/US 33 northbound) and Clinton Street (US 27/US 33 southbound) at which points the state routes turned north to join the others heading to/from downtown Fort Wayne. In the heart of the city US 33 departed, then upon leaving downtown Lafayette Street becomes Spy Run Boulevard (still one way northbound) before joining Clinton Street on the north side of the city. Shortly thereafter, US 27/SR 1/SR 3 turned toward the northwest onto Northrop Street and Lima Road until they reached the I-69 interchange, where SR 3 continued north on Lima Road and US 27/SR 1 turned east onto northbound I–69. With SR 3 through traffic easily using the then-recently completed I-69 to bypass Fort Wayne, the route between US 224 and the junction with SR 1 on the southwest side was turned back over to local control and the SR 3 designation was removed along the portions shared with other routes within the city.

Until 1980, SR 3 ran concurrently with SR 62 until it reached I-65 in Jeffersonville.

In 1990, the four-lane upgrade from the DeKalb–Allen County line north of Huntertown to Kendallville was completed, bypassing the towns of LaOtto and Avilla.

This section of highway along Lima Road was widened from four-lane divided roadway to six-lane divided highway and was completed in November 2011.

At one point, the northern terminus was at the Michigan state line.

Major intersections

References

External links

003
Transportation in Fort Wayne, Indiana
Transportation in Clark County, Indiana
Transportation in Scott County, Indiana
Transportation in Jennings County, Indiana
Transportation in Decatur County, Indiana
Transportation in Rush County, Indiana
Transportation in Henry County, Indiana
Transportation in Delaware County, Indiana
Transportation in Blackford County, Indiana
Transportation in Wells County, Indiana
Transportation in Huntington County, Indiana
Transportation in Allen County, Indiana
Transportation in DeKalb County, Indiana
Transportation in Noble County, Indiana
Transportation in LaGrange County, Indiana
Interstate 69